The Japan Science and Technology Agency (JST; Japanese: 科学技術振興機構) is a Japanese government agency which aims to build infrastructure that supports knowledge creation and dissemination in Japan. It operates from headquarters in Kawaguchi, Saitama in the Greater Tokyo Area, and in Chiyoda in central Tokyo.

The agency formed in 2003, as successor to the Japan Science and Technology Corporation. The corporation had formed in 1996 through the merging of the Japan Information Center of Science and Technology (JICST, est. 1957) and the Research Development Corporation of Japan (JRDC, est. 1961).

Among other activities, the agency runs J-STAGE, an "electronic journal platform for science and technology information in Japan," and publishes the Journal of Information Processing and Management. As a funder of research, the agency requires its grantees to follow its policy on open access and open science. It has now made operational Jxiv, preprints server in Japan.

Directors
 , 1973-1974 
 Ichiro Nakagawa, 1980-1982 
 Michinari Hamaguchi, 2015–2022
 Kazuhito Hashimoto, 2022–present

See also
 Science and technology in Japan
 List of Independent Administrative Institutes in Japan
 Research and development in Japan
 SATREPS

References

This article incorporates information from the Japanese Wikipedia.

External links
 Official site

Kawaguchi, Saitama
Science and technology in Japan
Independent Administrative Institutions of Japan
Scientific organizations based in Japan
Scientific organizations established in 2003
2003 establishments in Japan